Shoreham Academy is a co-educational secondary school and sixth form located in Shoreham-by-Sea, West Sussex, England which opened in September 2009. The academy replaced Kings Manor Community College, which closed in August 2009. The academy uses a house system, which they call 'schools', in which each house is named after a famous author. The schools are called: Wells, Doyle and Kipling.

The school was judged 'Outstanding' by Ofsted in 2012.

References

External links
 DCSF EduBase
 United Churches Schools Trust - Shoreham Academy

Academies in West Sussex
United Learning schools
Secondary schools in West Sussex
Shoreham-by-Sea